Ózdfalu is a village in Baranya county, Hungary.

Attractions
The Roman Catholic Church

Populated places in Baranya County